Mongolia has sent athletes to the 2016 Summer Paralympics in Rio de Janeiro, Brazil, from 7 September to 18 September 2016.

Medallists

Archery 

Dambadondogiin Baatarjav qualified for the 2016 Summer Paralympics in archery following his performance at the  2015 World Archery Para Championships, where he had a 9th-place finish in the men's open recurve.  
 Mongolia has had some success with archery in the Paralympics before, with Baatarjav Dambadondog winning the country's first gold medal in the country's history after finishing first in the sport at the 2008 Games.

Individual

Team

Athletics

Women's Field

Judo

Shooting

Powerlifting

See also
Mongolia at the 2016 Summer Olympics

References

Nations at the 2016 Summer Paralympics
2016
2016 in Mongolian sport